Victor Nikolaevich Popov (27 October 1937 – 16 April 1994) was a Russian theoretical physicist known for his contribution to the quantization of non-abelian gauge fields.  His work with Ludvig Faddeev on that subject introduced the fundamental objects now known as Faddeev–Popov ghosts.  Popov graduated from the Department of Theoretical Physics of the Physics Faculty of Leningrad State University.  Popov formed a group at LOMI in early 1965, where he remained for life.

Selected works
 
 Konopleva N. P., Popov V. N. (1982): Gauge Fields. Gordon & Breach Publishing Group. . (Originally published in Russian in 1972)

References

 L. Faddeev, How I came to work with Victor Popov, Journal of Mathematical Sciences 88 (2), 111—113 (1998).
 N. P. Konopleva, To the memory of V. N. Popov, Journal of Mathematical Sciences 88 (2), 114—115 (1998).

1937 births
1994 deaths
Soviet physicists
Theoretical physicists